This is a list of Bengali sweets and desserts.

Bangladeshi sweets and desserts

See also

Bangladeshi cuisine
Bengali cuisine
List of desserts

References

External links
 

 
Bangladeshi
Bangladeshi desserts
Bangladeshi Sweets